Charles Archibald Nichols (August 25, 1876 – April 25, 1920) was a politician from the U.S. state of Michigan.

Early life and education
Nichols was born to Mr. and Mrs. Thomas Whitney Nichols in Boyne City, Michigan, and attended the public schools. He engaged in newspaper work as reporter and criminal investigator for the Detroit Journal and the Detroit News from 1898 to 1905.  He served as secretary of the police department of the city of Detroit from 1905 to 1908 and as city clerk from 1908 to 1912.

United States House of Representatives
In 1914, Nichols was elected as a Republican from the newly created 13th congressional district of Michigan to the 64th United States Congress. He was twice re-elected to the 65th and 66th Congresses, serving from March 4, 1915, until his death in 1920.  He was chairman of the Committee on the Census in the 66th Congress.

Death
Charles A. Nichols died in office, in Washington, D.C., and is interred in Grand Lawn Cemetery, Detroit, Michigan.  Clarence McLeod was elected to fill the vacant seat.

See also
List of United States Congress members who died in office (1900–1949)

References

Charles Archibald Nichols at The Political Graveyard

1876 births
1920 deaths
Burials in Michigan
City and town clerks
The Detroit News people
Republican Party members of the United States House of Representatives from Michigan
People from Boyne City, Michigan
19th-century American newspaper people
20th-century American newspaper people
20th-century American politicians